The 2016–17 Utah Valley Wolverines men's basketball team represented Utah Valley University in the 2016–17 NCAA Division I men's basketball season. The Wolverines, led by second-year head coach Mark Pope, played their home games at the UCCU Center in Orem, Utah as members of the Western Athletic Conference. They finished the season 17–17, 6–8 in WAC play to finish in fifth place. They defeated Seattle in the quarterfinals of the WAC tournament before losing in the semifinals to Cal State Bakersfield. They received an invitation to the College Basketball Invitational where they defeated Georgia Southern and Rice before losing in the semifinals to Wyoming.

Previous season 
The Wolverines finished the 2015–16 season 12–18, 6–8 in WAC play to finish in fifth place. They lost in the quarterfinals of the WAC tournament to UMKC.

Offseason

Departures

Incoming transfers

Recruiting class of 2016

Roster

Radio broadcasts and streams
All Wolverines games will air on KOVO, AKA ESPN 960 Sports. Games will be streamed online through ESPN 960's webpage as well as at Utah Valley's Stretch Internet feed.

Schedule and results

|-
!colspan=9 style=| Exhibition

|-
!colspan=9 style=| Non-conference regular season

|-
!colspan=9 style=| WAC regular season

|-
!colspan=9 style=| WAC tournament

|-
!colspan=9 style=| CBI

References

Utah Valley Wolverines men's basketball seasons
Utah Valley
Utah Valley